The 1959–60 LFF Lyga was the 39th season of the LFF Lyga football competition in Lithuania.  It was contested by 12 teams, and Elnias Šiauliai won the championship.

League standings

Playoff
Elnias Šiauliai 3-2 Raudonoji Žvaigždė Vilnius

References
RSSSF

LFF Lyga seasons
1959 in Lithuania
1960 in Lithuania
LFF
LFF